Manod Mawr North Top is a mountain in North Wales and forms part of the Moelwynion.

It lies directly to the north of its parent Manod Mawr, separated by the Graig Ddu Quarry. Crossing the quarry to reach the main summit can be dangerous. There are also a few mine adits on the northern slopes. There were fears that the top may eventually be removed.

References

External links 
 www.geograph.co.uk : photos of Manod Mawr north Top and surrounding area

Bro Machno
Ffestiniog
Mountains and hills of Conwy County Borough
Mountains and hills of Gwynedd
Mountains and hills of Snowdonia
Hewitts of Wales
Nuttalls